Ctenodes decemmaculata is a species of beetle in the family Cerambycidae. It was described by Oliver in 1807.

References

Trachyderini
Beetles described in 1807